The following is an incomplete list of Monastic houses in Australia.

Catholic Orders in Australia and New Zealand

Male Religious Orders

 Tarrawarra Abbey, Victoria, Australia. Trappist monastery founded from Ireland in 1954. Since 1998 Tarrawarra has had a daughter house in Kerala, India: Kurisumala Ashram. See .
 Benedictine Abbey, New Norcia, Western Australia
 Monastery of Saint Benedict, Arcadia, New South Wales. See 
 Southern Star Abbey, New Zealand. Southern Star is a Trappist monastery.
 Blessed Sacrament Fathers in Sydney and Melbourne. See .
 Notre Dame Priory. A traditional Benedictine monastery established in 2017 in Colebrook, Tasmania, Australia.
Pauline Fathers. Marian Valley, Queensland and Penrose Park, New South Wales.
Saint Charbel's Monastery, Antonin Maronite Order. Coburg, Victoria
Saint Charbel's Monastery, Lebanese Maronite Order. Punchbowl New South Wales
Saint John the Beloved's Monastery, Lebanese Maronite Missionaries. Mt. Druitt, New South Wales
St John Paul II Monastery, Maronite Order of the Blessed Virgin Mary. Ryde, New South Wales

Female Religious Orders

 Benedictine Abbey, Jamberoo, New South Wales. See . This community of Benedictine Nuns have had a continuing presence in NSW since 1848.
 Benedictine Monastery of the Transfiguration, Tanby, Yeppoon, Queensland. See .
 Sisters of the Good Samaritan of the Order of St Benedict
 Discalced Carmelites have monasteries for women in the Australian cities of Sydney, Perth, Melbourne, Adelaide, Brisbane (see ) and the New Zealand city of Christchurch (see ).
 Poor Clares have a number of monasteries for women in Sydney. The Order of Saint Clare have monasteries in Waverley and Riverstone. See  A separate congregation of Poor Clares have a monastery in Campbelltown, named Bethlehem Monastery
 Tyburn Nuns, convents located in Riverstone, NSW, Australia and Bombay, New Zealand
 Maronite College of the Holy Family & Convent, Maronite Sisters of the Holy Family. Harris Park NSW
 St Maroun's College & Convent, Maronite Sisters of the Holy Family.  Dulwich Hill NSW
 Maronite Sisters of the Holy Family Nursing Village & Convent, Maronite Sisters of the Holy Family. Dulwich Hill NSW
 Maronite Antonine Sisters College & Convent, Maronite Antonine Sisters. East Coburg VIC
 St Paul's Community, Maronite Antonine Sisters. Thornbury VIC
 Brigidine Southern Cross Community, Brigidine Sisters. Malvern Victoria

A completer list of Catholic Religious Orders in Australia can be found here:

See Catholic religious orders for a list of non-monastic and monastic Catholic institutes.

Anglican Orders
Community of Saints Barnabas and Cecilia, Peterborough, South Australia
Community of the Sisters of the Church
Community of Christ the King, Taminick, Victoria
Community of Christ the King
Community of the Holy Name
St Mark's Benedictine Abbey, Cambelltown Victoria
Society of St Francis of Australia
Oratory of the Good Shepherd
Little Brothers of Francis
Sisters of the Incarnation
Community of the Sisters of the Church
Society of the Sacred Advent
Society of the Sacred Mission
Order of Saint Benedict, Camperdown

see Anglican religious orders for other Anglican religious orders

Greek Orthodox Archdiocese of Australia
Monastery of St George, Winmalee, NSW. Male monastery under Archimandrite Kyriakos. 
Monastery of Panayia Gorgoepikoos, Geelong, Vic. Female monastery under Abbess: Mother Kallistheni. 
Monastery of the Holy Cross, Mangrove, NSW. Female monastery, under Abbess Mother Philothei. 
Monastery of St John of the Mountain, Forrestfield, Western Australia under Hieromonk Evagrios.
Monastery of Pantanassa, Lower Mangrove Creek, NSW. Male monastery Under Archimandrite Stephanos (Pantanassiotis).

Serbian Orthodox Church in Australia and New Zealand
Monastery of St Sava (New Kalenic), Hall, Australian Capital Territory
Monastery of St Sava, Elaine, Victoria. Male monastery under Abbot Iguman Teodor (Bojovic). 
Skete of the Nativity of the Theotokos, Inglewood, South Australia. Female skete under Abbess: Igumanija Anastasija

Antiochian Orthodox Archdiocese of Australia and New Zealand
Monastery of St Anna, Preston, Victoria. Female monastery under  Abbess: Riasophor Theodora.

ROCOR - Australian and New Zealand Diocese
Monastery of Prophet Elias, Monarto, South Australia. Male monastery. Under Abbot Hieromonk Benjamin. 
Monastery of Our Lady of Kazan, Kentlyn, New South Wales. Female monastery under Abbess: Nun Maria (administrator). 
Monastery of Archangel Michael, Marrickville, NSW. Male monastery under Abbot: Igumen Kosmas (Vasilopoulos). 
Saint Petroc Monastery, Cascades, Tas. Male monastery of the Western Rite under Abbot: Hieromonk Michael (Mansbridge-Wood). 
Monastery of the Presentation of the Mother of God, Bungarby, New South Wales. Female monastery under Abbess Mother Anna (Karipoff) 
Monastery of Holy Transfiguration, Bombala, NSW. Male monastery. Under Abbot Archimandrite Alexis (Rosentool) 
Monastery of the Holy Trinity, Monkerai, NSW. Male monastery under Abbot Hieromonk John (Macpherson). 
St. John the Baptist Skete, Kentlyn, NSW. Male skete under Abbot Hieromonk Joachim (Ross)

References

Australia